This list comprises buildings, sites, structures, districts, and objects in Milwaukee County, which are listed on the National Register of Historic Places. There are 283 NRHP sites listed in Milwaukee County, including 211 in the City of Milwaukee included in the National Register of Historic Places listings in Milwaukee, Wisconsin and 72 outside of the city, listed below. Eight previously listed sites (outside of Milwaukee) have been removed.

Current listings

|}

Former listings

|}

See also

National Register of Historic Places listings in Milwaukee, Wisconsin
List of National Historic Landmarks in Wisconsin
National Register of Historic Places listings in Wisconsin
Listings in neighboring counties: Ozaukee, Racine, Washington, Waukesha

References

 
Milwaukee